Dryophthorus is a genus of true weevils in the family of beetles known as Curculionidae. There are at least 60 described species in Dryophthorus.

Species
These 63 species belong to the genus Dryophthorus:

 Dryophthorus acarophilus Davis & Engel, 2006 c
 Dryophthorus alluaudi Hustache, 1922 c
 Dryophthorus americanus Bedel, 1885 i c b
 Dryophthorus armaticollis Marshall, 1931 c
 Dryophthorus assimilis Gahan, C.J., 1900 c
 Dryophthorus atomus Fairmaire, L., 1893 c
 Dryophthorus auriculatus Richard, 1957 c
 Dryophthorus bituberculatus Schoenherr, 1838 c
 Dryophthorus boettcheri Voss, 1940 c
 Dryophthorus brevipennis Perkins, 1900 i c
 Dryophthorus brevis Voss, 1934 c
 Dryophthorus cocosensis Champion, G.C., 1909 c
 Dryophthorus consimilis Voss, 1963 c
 Dryophthorus corticalis Say, 1831 c g
 Dryophthorus crassus Sharp, 1878 i c
 Dryophthorus crenatus Boisduval, 1835 c
 Dryophthorus curtus Hustache, 1933 c
 Dryophthorus declivis Sharp, 1878 i c
 Dryophthorus dissimilis Voss, 1940 c
 †Dryophthorus distinguendus Perkins, 1900 c
 Dryophthorus ecarinatus Champion, 1914 c
 Dryophthorus excavatus Boheman, 1838 c
 Dryophthorus explanipennis Richard, 1957 c
 Dryophthorus forestieri Perroud, B.P., 1864 c
 Dryophthorus fuscescens Perkins, 1900 c
 Dryophthorus gravidus Sharp, 1878 i c
 Dryophthorus guadelupensis Hustache, 1932 c
 Dryophthorus homoeorhynchus Perkins, 1900 i c
 Dryophthorus indicus Voss, 1940 c
 Dryophthorus insignis Sharp, 1878 i c
 Dryophthorus insignoides Perkins, 1900 i c
 Dryophthorus japonicus Konishi, 1963 c
 Dryophthorus kalshoveni Voss, 1963 c
 Dryophthorus kaszabi Hoffmann, 1968 c
 Dryophthorus kauaiensis Perkins, 1900 i c
 Dryophthorus laticauda Fairmaire, L., 1901 c
 Dryophthorus lymexylon Germar, 1824 c
 Dryophthorus modestus Sharp, 1878 i c
 Dryophthorus muscosus Marshall, 1931 c
 Dryophthorus nanus Hustache, 1932 c
 Dryophthorus nesiotes Perkins, 1900 i c
 Dryophthorus oahuensis Perkins, 1900 i c
 Dryophthorus ocularis Konishi, 1963 c
 Dryophthorus peles Perkins, 1900 i c
 Dryophthorus perahuae Zimmerman, 1968 c
 Dryophthorus persimilis Voss, 1940 c
 Dryophthorus pusillus Sharp, 1878 i c
 Dryophthorus quadricollis Champion, G.C., 1909 c
 Dryophthorus rapaae Zimmerman, 1968 c
 Dryophthorus rugulosus Richard, 1957 c
 Dryophthorus sculpturatus Konishi, 1963 c
 Dryophthorus setulosus Motschulsky, V. de, 1866 c
 Dryophthorus squalidus Sharp, 1878 i c
 Dryophthorus subtruncatus Voss, 1940 c
 Dryophthorus superbus Zherikhin, 2000 c
 Dryophthorus trichocerus Montrouzier, X., 1860 c
 Dryophthorus tricuspis Faust, J., 1899 c
 Dryophthorus verticalis Perkins, 1900 i c
 Dryophthorus viettei Richard, 1957 c
 Dryophthorus zuluanus Voss, 1974 c

Data sources: i = ITIS, c = Catalogue of Life, g = GBIF, b = Bugguide.net

References

Further reading

External links

 

Curculionidae genera
Dryophthorinae
Taxonomy articles created by Polbot